Franz Winkelmeier (27 April 1860 – 24 August 1887) was an Austrian man who was promoted as the world's tallest man at ; however, he was measured by well known physician Rudolf Virchow at . He was known as the Giant of Friedburg-Lengau.

Biography 
He was born as a son of a family of smallholding farmers in Lengau, Upper Austria. Two years later, his parents bought the Schöscharngut between Friedburg and Lengau. In Friedburg, Franz Winkelmeier attended elementary school. Until the age of fourteen years, his growth was normal.

Franz Winkelmeier made his first public appearance as an anomaly on 6 October 1881 in Braunau. He was promoted by an efficient tailor from Friedburg, and  appeared in Lower Austria, Steiermark, Carinthia, Görz, Triest, Fiume, Hungaria and Siebenbürgen.

In the summer of 1885 he was in Tyrol, and from 1 September until 30 November he was seen in the Concordia-Theater in Berlin. Even the tall soldiers of Emperor Wilhelm seemed to be dwarves beside him.

After appearing in more German cities, he went to Paris at the Folies Bergère theater. On 9 November 1886 he was hired by R. Rosingky to go to London. On 22 June 1887 he was presented to Queen Victoria.

As soon as he finished his tours, Franz Winkelmeier died of tuberculosis. He was buried in the cemetery in Lengau. In the restaurant Zum Riesen there are a lot of mementos of Franz Winkelmeier.

Bibliography 

Mairhofer-Irrsee, Hans. Der Riese von Lengau 
Turrini, Peter. Der Riese vom Steinfeld. Oper von Friedrich Cerha

References

Österreichischer Auslandsdienst - Austrian Service Abroad
Riese von Lengau Tage Homepage

External links 
Report to Lengau
Memorial to Lengau 
Upper Austrian Museum Alliance
thetallestman Franz Winkelmeyer

1860 births
1887 deaths
People from Braunau am Inn
19th-century deaths from tuberculosis
People with gigantism
Braunau am Inn
Tuberculosis deaths in Austria